The Malacca River which flows through the middle of Malacca City in Malacca, Malaysia, was a vital trade route during the heyday of Malacca Sultanate in the 15th century.

The river starts from the foothills in the neighbouring state of Negeri Sembilan and feeds into the Strait of Malacca. A USD$100 million (RM350 million) infrastructure project to revive and rejuvenate the river which is the central to Malacca as a historical city was carried out. This has included construction of a tidal barrage, restoration of buildings and bridges, dredging, concrete river banks with river walkways. Land reclamation projects have extended the river mouth further into the Straits.

Tourist attractions
 Melaka River Cruise - 45-minute river tour boat ride.

See also
 Geography of Malaysia
 List of rivers of Malaysia
 Muar River

References

Rivers of Malacca
Tourist attractions in Malacca
Rivers of Malaysia